Intarsia is a form of wood inlaying that is similar to marquetry. The start of the practice dates from before the seventh century AD. The technique of intarsia inlays sections of wood (at times with contrasting ivory or bone, or mother-of-pearl) within the solid wood matrix of floors and walls or of tabletops and other furniture; by contrast marquetry assembles a pattern out of veneers glued upon the carcass. The word intarsia may derive from the Latin word interserere (to insert).

Certosina is a variant also using pieces of ivory, bone or mother of pearl. Intarsia is mostly used of Italian, or at least European work. Similar techniques are found over much of Asia and the Middle East.

History 

When Egypt came under Arab rule in the seventh century, indigenous arts of intarsia and wood inlay, which lent themselves to non-representational decors and tiling patterns, spread throughout the Maghreb. The technique of intarsia was already perfected in Islamic North Africa before it was introduced into Christian Europe through Sicily and Andalusia. The art was further developed in Siena and by Sienese masters at the cathedral of Orvieto, where figurative intarsia made their first appearance, c. 1330 and continuing into the 15th century and in northern Italy in the fifteenth and sixteenth centuries, spreading to German centers and introduced into London by Flemish craftsmen in the later sixteenth century. The most elaborate examples of intarsia can be found in cabinets of this period, which were items of great luxury and prestige. Multiple colors could be used by exploiting differently-colored spalted woods. After about 1620, marquetry tended to supplant intarsia in urbane cabinet work. 

Intarsia gained popularity in the United States in the 1980s as a wooden art technique using a band saw or scroll saw. Early practitioners made money both by selling their art, and by selling patterns for others to use. In France Georges Vriz proposed a new method for marquetry. Contrary to other techniques, based on a decoration "flat" made of wood or other material, George Virz superimposed the layers of wood using thin, transparent elements that impart color and depth.

Process 

Intarsia uses varied shapes, sizes, and species of wood fitted together to create a mosaic-like picture with an illusion of depth. Intarsia is created through the selection of different types of wood, using their grain pattern and coloring to create variations in the pattern. After selecting the specific woods for the pattern, the woodworker cuts, shapes, and finishes each piece. Some areas of the pattern may be raised to create more depth. The completed individual pieces fit together like a jig-saw puzzle, glued to a wooden backer-board cut to the outline of the pattern. This typically creates a three-dimensional effect as seen in the studiolo of the Palazzo Ducale, Urbino.

Today intarsia can be made from purchased patterns. To make intarsia from a pattern, first wood is chosen based on color and grain pattern. Next the pattern is transferred onto the wood and individual pieces are precisely cut out on the band saw or scroll saw. The pieces are then sanded individually or in groups to add depth to the piece. Once the sanding is completed, the wood pieces are fitted together to form the final result. A finish (for example a clear gel stain) can be applied to the individual pieces before gluing, or to the glued final version.

See also 
 Cosmatesque
 Cosmati
 Damascening
 Duomo di Siena
 Lathart
 Pietra dura

References 

 Opificio delle Pietre Dure, Florence, an institute of the Ministry for Cultural Heritage
 Jackson, F. Hamilton, Intarsia and Marquetry, (London: Sands & Co.) 1903 excerpt

External links 

 Scrollsaw Association of the World website 
The Gubbio Studiolo and its conservation, volumes 1 & 2, from The Metropolitan Museum of Art Libraries (fully available online as PDF), which contains material on intarsia (see index)

Surface decorative techniques in woodworking
Crafts